The Phayao Kingdom was a period in the history of Phayao in Northern Thailand. It began with a revolt against the Chiang Rai rule in the northern Thailand.

Legend and history 
Phayao legend began with one lord titled Khun Chom Tham, son of Phaya Lao Ngoen Rueang, ruler of the Hiran Ngoenyang Kingdom. During the late reigning period of Phaya Lao Ngoen Rueang, he divided his kingdom to his two sons, Khun Chom Tham and his brother Lao Sin. Lao Sin became the new ruler of Hiran Ngoenyang while Khun Chom Tham gathered an army and citizens to build a new territory. At the age of 25, Khun Chom Tham brought his troops down to Chiang Muan area. In the myth, Khun Chom Tham found a deserted town at the end of the Mountain Range. He expanded it into a city to become his seat and the construction ended on 1094. He named his Kingdom Phukamyao.

Khun Chom Tham's dynasty ruled Phukamyao over 9 generations until the last Phukamyao king gave the throne to his son-in-law, Phaya Ngam Mueang. Ngam Mueang led his Kingdom to it greatest period and renamed it to Kingdom of Phayao.

History would later mention the Phayao kingdom when Mangrai ascended to the throne of the Kingdom of Ngoenyang in Muang Rao in 1261. Phayao was cited in the wider campaign of Mangrai to consolidate Thai territories, which was driven by two factors: the neighboring kingdoms' slight to his authority; and, the scarcity of space and resources for the growing population of his subjects. The kingdom expanded to the south and Phayao was eventually absorbed as Mangrai founded the Lan Na Kingdom. This development did not immediately transpire with conquest. After invading, Mueang Lai, Chiang Kham and Chiang Khong, Mangrai concluded an alliance with other kingdoms and these included a pact with Phayao's King Ngam Muang and King Ram Khamhaeng of Sukhothai in 1287. By 1338, the Phayao kingdom, which was not as powerful as the Lan Na and Sukhothai, was finally annexed into the former.

See also 
 Phayao Province

Bibliography 
 เจดีย์ไทยผู้ออกแบบและผลิตบุษบก เจดีย์ ผอบใส่พระธาตุ. Web. 16 Jan. 2011. <http://www.jedeethai.com/>.
 jedeethai.com ประวัติสถูปเจดีย์/สถูปเจดีย์ยุคพะเยา
 http://www.dek-d.com/board/view.php?id=791375

References

 
Former countries in Thai history
Former countries in Southeast Asia
Tai history
States and territories established in 1094
States and territories disestablished in 1338
Thailand
Former monarchies of Asia
11th-century establishments in Thailand